Lotfi Missaoui (born 4 September 1970) is a Tunisian boxer. He competed in the men's middleweight event at the 1992 Summer Olympics.

References

1970 births
Living people
Tunisian male boxers
Olympic boxers of Tunisia
Boxers at the 1992 Summer Olympics
Place of birth missing (living people)
Middleweight boxers
20th-century Tunisian people